Antoine-Marie-Benoit Besson (1876–1969) was a French military officer. In World War II he was a general commanding the Third Army Group stationed along the river Rhine manning the Maginot Line.

Military career

World War I: 1914–1918 
During World War I, Besson commanded the 4th Zouaves Regiment.

Interwar period: 1918–1939 
In the interbellum, he commanded the 58th Brigade, the 15th Infantry Division and the 16th Army Corps.

World War II: 1939–1940 
In September 1939, he commanded the 6th Army deployed in the Alps.

In October 1939, he took command of the French 3rd Army Group, which covered the section of the Maginot Line along the Rhine and the Swiss frontier. He and his command surrendered after 25 June as German Panzer units had reached the Swiss border and cut off the Maginot Line from the rest of France.

Sources 
M Romanych & M Rupp, Maginot Line 1940, Battles on the French frontier, Osprey Publishing, page 13

References

French military personnel of World War I
French military personnel of World War II
French generals
1876 births
1969 deaths
École Spéciale Militaire de Saint-Cyr alumni
Grand Croix of the Légion d'honneur
Recipients of the Croix de Guerre 1914–1918 (France)